Doom Dooma Assembly constituency is one of the 126 assembly constituencies of  Assam a north east state of India.  Doom Dooma is also part of Lakhimpur Lok Sabha constituency. Dileswar Tanti is a MLA of Doom Dooma Constituency from 1978 to 2006. He won six times from the INC Party. In 1996 he was the Labour Minister of Assam. He is the General Secretary of Assam Chah Mazdoor Sangha Assam.

Doom Dooma Assembly constituency

Following are details on Doom Dooma (Vidhan Sabha constituency)

Country: India.
 State: Assam.
 District:  Tinsukia district.
 Lok Sabha Constituency: Lakhimpur Lok Sabha/Parliamentary constituency.
 Assembly Categorisation: Rural constituency.
 Literacy Level:70.92%.
 Eligible Electors as per 2021 General Elections: 1,20,375  Eligible Electors. Male Electors:61,085. Female Electors:59,290 .
 Geographic Co-Ordinates:  27°34'02.6"N 95°36'02.9"E.
 Total Area Covered:3188 square kilometres.
 Area Includes: Doom Dooma and Hapjan (part) mouzas and the villages in Saikhowa mouza specified in item of the Appendix in Doom Dooma thana in Tinsukia sub-division ,Tinsukia district of Assam.
 Inter State Border :Tinsukia district.
 Number Of Polling Stations: Year 2011-158,Year 2016-160,Year 2021-125.

Members of Legislative Assembly
Following is the list of past members representing Doom Dooma Assembly constituency in Assam Legislature:-

 1951: Harihar Chowdhury, Indian National Congress 
 1957: Molia Tati, Indian National Congress 
 1962: Molia Tati, Indian National Congress 
 1967: Molia Tati, Indian National Congress 
 1972: Molia Tati, Indian National Congress 
 1978: Dileswar Tanti, Indian National Congress 
 1983: Dileswar Tanti, Indian National Congress 
 1985: Dileswar Tanti, Indian National Congress 
 1991: Dileswar Tanti, Indian National Congress 
 1996: Dileswar Tanti, Indian National Congress 
 2001: Dileswar Tanti, Indian National Congress 
 2006: Durga Bhumij, Indian National Congress 
 2011: Dilip Moran, Bharatiya Janata Party
 2016: Durga Bhumij, Indian National Congress
 2021: Rupesh Gowala, Bharatiya Janata Party

Election results

2016 result

2011 result

2006 result

See also
 Doom Dooma
 Tinsukia district
 List of constituencies of Assam Legislative Assembly

References

External links 
 

Assembly constituencies of Assam
Tinsukia district